James Stewart Bulloch (23 October 1909 – 27 April 1992) was a Scottish footballer who played for  Hamilton Academical, Alloa Athletic and Dumbarton, mainly at left back. He captained Hamilton in the 1935 Scottish Cup Final which they lost 2–1 to Rangers, then won promotion from the second tier in 1938–39 with Alloa after being recruited by former Accies teammate Jimmy McStay who had taken over as manager. Bulloch served in the Lothians and Border Horse regiment during World War II, and moved to Germany to coach football after the war ended. Bulloch was in 1948 and 1949 coach in the Netherlands at AGOVV winning the Eerste klasse oost and was third in Dutch championship 1948/49.

References

1909 births
1992 deaths
Scottish footballers
Dumbarton F.C. wartime guest players
Albion Rovers F.C. players
Alloa Athletic F.C. players
Greenock Morton F.C. players
Scottish Football League players
Hamilton Academical F.C. players
Sportspeople from Wishaw
Association football defenders
Scottish emigrants to Germany
Scottish Junior Football Association players
Scotland junior international footballers
British Army personnel of World War II
Lothians and Border Horse soldiers
Scottish expatriate sportspeople in Germany
Scottish expatriate sportspeople in the Netherlands
Footballers from North Lanarkshire
AGOVV Apeldoorn managers
Expatriate football managers in the Netherlands
Scottish football managers
Scottish expatriate football managers
Association football coaches